"No Sleep till Brooklyn" is a song by the New York hip hop group the Beastie Boys, and the sixth single from their debut studio album, Licensed to Ill. One of their signature songs, it describes an exhaustive tour and all the events that make it tiresome, but also emphasizes their determination not to rest until they reach their home base of Brooklyn. "No Sleep till Brooklyn" was a popular concert favorite for the Beastie Boys and traditionally used as their closing song.  Among other references to then-popular metal, the title is a play on the Motörhead album No Sleep 'til Hammersmith. The song has been several covers and parodies including "Stutter Rap (No Sleep til Bedtime)" by Morris Minor and the Majors.

Cash Box called it "a raucous, rambunctious blend of rap, smart-ass and heavy metal."

Production and play
Kerry King, guitarist for Slayer, played the guitar riffs and solo; Slayer had released an album produced by Rick Rubin in 1986 (Reign in Blood). In a different tuning, the song interprets "TNT" by AC/DC. More metal commentary and adaptation is added by the video, directed by Ric Menello, as a parody of glam metal.

Later in their career, the Beastie Boys continued to perform the song live, although with altered lyrics to downplay their early party-boy reputation. "M.C.A.'s in the back because he's skeezin' with a whore," was changed to "M.C.A.'s in the back with the mahjong board", and "Autographed pictures and classy hoes" was changed to "Autographed pictures to nobody knows."

The song features one of many homages to New York City's boroughs, and has been described as "joyful ranting".

Bob Dylan played the song on the "New York" episode of Season 1 of his Theme Time Radio Hour show in 2007, noting the Beastie Boys were not merely a "flash in the pan" in his introduction.

Music video
The music video for "No Sleep till Brooklyn" was co-directed by Ric Menello and Adam Dubin. Menello and Dubin also directed the video for the Beastie Boys' preceding single, "(You Gotta) Fight for Your Right (To Party!)". Kerry King, who plays guitar on this track, also appears in the video. Ruth Collins, an actress best known for 80s B-movie horrors, is the lead dancer.

Synopsis
The Beastie Boys arrive at a club to perform. A member from the band hands the club owner an LP record but he smashes the phonograph record on them, saying "What the..? We only play rock music here." The Beastie Boys knock again, seconds later, except they are disguised as rockers with big hair and guitars. They take the stage playing the song, but the crowd of women quickly mobs them and tears off their clothes. They rap another verse in their underwear before changing into their regular outfits. The performance is a series of jabs at and parody of glam metal performance videos, with headbanging fans, a backup dancer, and much destruction. Eventually the club owner and his crew try to get them off the stage, but the Beastie Boys are fighting with them. Kerry King makes an appearance during the guitar solo, body-checking the gorilla who was originally performing the guitar solo. The band is later seen trying to steal money from the club's safe, which they succeed in doing by MCA bashing it with his head. They dance around with bags of money from the safe, while the hot backup dancer is seen walking away with the gorilla.

Charts

References

External links

Songs about sleep
Songs about New York City
1986 songs
1987 singles
Beastie Boys songs
Song recordings produced by Rick Rubin
Songs written by Ad-Rock
Songs written by Mike D
Songs written by Adam Yauch
Songs written by Rick Rubin
1987 neologisms
Quotations from music
Quotations from hip hop music